Milocera horaria is a species of moth of the family Geometridae first described by Charles Swinhoe in 1904. It is found on Madagascar.

This species has a winglength of 11–14 mm.

References
Swinhoe, Charles (1904). "On the Geometridae of tropical Africa in the National Collection". Transactions of the Entomological Society of London. 1904 (3): 522.

External links

Ennominae
Moths described in 1904
Moths of Madagascar
Moths of Africa